The Enemy is a lost 1916 silent film drama directed by Paul Scardon and starring Charles Kent, Julia Swayne Gordon, Peggy Hyland.

Cast
Charles Kent – Harrison Stuart
Julia Swayne Gordon – Mrs. Stuart
Peggy Hyland – Tavy, the daughter
Evart Overton – Billy Lane
Billie Billings – Geraldine
James Morrison – Tommy Tinkle
Edward Elkas – Jerry
Charles Wellesley – B. B. Bennings

References

External links

1916 films
American silent feature films
Lost American films
American black-and-white films
Vitagraph Studios films
Films directed by Paul Scardon
Silent American drama films
1916 drama films
1916 lost films
Lost drama films
1910s American films